Archeorhinotermes is an extinct genus of termites in the family Archeorhinotermitidae, and is the sole genus of the family. There is one described species in Archeorhinotermes, A. rossi. It was discovered in Burmese amber.

References

Termites